MariNaomi (born as Mari Naomi Schaal; born August 2, 1973) is an American graphic artist and cartoonist who often publishes autobiographical comics and is also well known for creating three online databases of underrepresented cartoonists.

Career
MariNaomi's has been drawing comics since 1997, starting out as a zine creator. Her comics are usually autobiographical. She talks about the search for her roots, her status as a mixed race queer woman, as well as her feminism. Her article "Writing People of Color" discusses how people of color should approach writing about people from a race that is not their own. MariNaomi stated "I feel like race is such a sensitive issue that I wanted feedback and I wanted to know how better to do it and to share that information.".

MariNaomi wrote an article It Happened to Me: I Was Sexually Harassed Onstage at a Comic Convention Panel for XOJane in 2013 describing her experience of being harassed on stage as a panelist at a comics convention. She did not name her harasser, but Scott Lobdell later came forward and issued a public apology for his actions.

MariNaomi founded and maintains three online databases of cartoonists: the Cartoonists of Color Database, the Queer Cartoonists Database and the Disabled Cartoonists Database. In 2014, she began the Cartoonists of Color Database and created the Queer Cartoonists Database soon after. In 2019, she launched the Disabled Cartoonists Database. The opt-in per creator database Queer Cartoonists contains 775 entries as of May 2018 and has been reported to be helpful in the professional careers of upcoming cartoonists. Librarians and archivists specializing in comic book studies have also highlighted the need for open access databases like these. 

MariNaomi has written and drawn comics columns for several websites, including The Rumpus and SFBAY.ca. In 2016, she was featured at the Smithsonian Asian Pacific American Center conference on imagined futures. 

Since 2017, she and fellow author Myriam Gurba have been hosting an advice podcast called AskBiGrlz  where they answer listener questions.

In 2021, MariNaomi created a Stop AAPI Hate mural in Garvey Park in Rosemead, California. The comic-strip inspired 60-by10-foot mural covers the side of a recreational park building. Connie Chung Joe of Asian Americans Advancing Justice – Los Angeles said the mural is "a wake-up call that Asian-Americans in this country have been scapegoated. Not just by this pandemic, but time and time again in American history.”

Personal life
Her mother is Japanese and her father is a Caucasian American. Born as Mari Naomi Schaal in Texas in 1973, she grew up in Mill Valley, California and later moved to San Jose, California. She began using the name MariNaomi in 2003. She worked in illegal hostess bars while she briefly lived in Japan. She wrote about those experiences in her memoir, Turning Japanese.

Publications
 Kiss & Tell: A Romantic Resume, Ages 0 to 22 (Harper Perennial, 2011) 
 Dragon's Breath and Other True Stories (2dcloud/Uncivilized Books, 2014) 
 Turning Japanese (2dcloud, 2016) 
 I Thought YOU Hated ME (Retrofit Comics, 2016) 
 Losing the Girl (Graphic Universe, 2018) 
 Gravity's Pull (Graphic Universe, 2018) 
Distant Stars (Graphic Universe, 2020) 
Dirty Produce (Workman Publishing Company, 2021)

References

External links
 Personal website
 Cartoonists of Color database
 Queer Cartoonists database
 Disabled Cartoonists database

1973 births
Living people
20th-century American women artists
20th-century American women writers
21st-century American women artists
21st-century American women writers
American female comics artists
American comics writers
American expatriates in Japan
American artists of Japanese descent
American writers of Japanese descent
Artists from San Jose, California
Artists from Texas
Female comics writers
LGBT comics creators
People from Mill Valley, California
Queer artists
Queer women
Queer writers
Writers from Texas